Dr. S Shivaraj Patil (born 8 May 1970) is an Indian politician serving as member of Karnataka Legislative Assembly since 2013. He was re elected to Member of Karnataka Legislative Assembly from Raichur City in the 2018 Karnataka Legislative Assembly election to the house as a member of the Bharatiya Janata Party.

Early life and education
Shivaraj Patil was born on 8 May 1970, in Raichur, Karnataka. He completed his schooling at Tagore Memorial School in 1989. And later he completed his MBBS from Government Medical College Bellary in 1944.

Political career
In 2013 he joined Jantha Dal Secular Party. And in the 2013 Vidhan Sabha elections, he triumphed over Syed Yasin of the Congress party by a margin of 7871 votes. In 2018 he joined Bharatiya Janata Party, and won again against Syed Yasin of the Congress party in the 2018 Vidhan Sabha elections by a margin of 10,991 votes by representing the Bharatiya Janata Party.

References 

People from Raichur
Members of the Karnataka Legislative Assembly
Bharatiya Janata Party politicians

1970 births
Living people